The French ironclad Normandie was the third and last of the three wooden-hulled s built for the French Navy in 1858–62. The ships of the Gloire class were classified as armoured frigates because they only had a single gun deck and their traditional disposition of guns arrayed along the length of the hull also meant that they were broadside ironclads. Normandie was the first ironclad to cross the Atlantic in support of the French intervention in Mexico in 1862. Although the ship was active during the Franco-Prussian War of 1870–71, she saw no action. The unseasoned timber of her hull rotted quickly; she was condemned in 1871 and subsequently scrapped.

Design and description
Designed by the French naval architect Henri Dupuy de Lôme, the ships of the class were intended to fight in the line of battle, unlike the first British ironclads.

Normandie had a single horizontal return connecting-rod compound steam engine that drove one propeller.

The Gloire-class ships were armed with 36 Modèle 1858  broadside. The remaining two guns were placed on the upper deck as chase guns. They fired a  shell at a muzzle velocity of only  and proved to be ineffective against armour. They were replaced by rifled breech-loading Modèle 1864 guns in 1868. Six  guns were mounted in the centre of the gun deck and a pair of  guns replaced the original chase guns.

Construction and service
Named after the province of Normandy, Normandie was ordered around September 1858, six months after her sisters. The ship was laid down at the Arsenal de Cherbourg on 14 September 1858, launched on 10 March 1860 and completed on 13 May 1862. In July 1862, Normandie became the first ironclad to cross the Atlantic, as the flagship of Vice Admiral Edmond Jurien de La Gravière, on her way to support the French intervention in Mexico. She was forced to return in April 1863 due to an outbreak of yellow fever that killed her captain, among others. While assigned to the Mediterranean Fleet, the ship made a port visit in August 1865 to Brest where the fleet hosted the British Channel Fleet. A few days later the French fleet made a reciprocal visit to Portsmouth where it was hosted by the Channel Fleet. From 1865 to 1868, Normandie was assigned to the Evolutionary Squadron where she was commanded by Bernard Jauréguiberry, among others. The ship was assigned to the ironclad squadron commanded by Rear Admiral Didelot during the Franco-Prussian War, but saw no action. Built of unseasoned timber, Normandie was in poor shape after the war and was decommissioned on 17 June 1871. Condemned on 1 August, the ship was subsequently broken up and her engine was installed in the breastwork monitor .

Notes

References

 

 

1860 ships
Ships built in France
Second French intervention in Mexico
Gloire-class ironclads